On March 10, 1977, then-43-year-old film director Roman Polanski was arrested and charged in Los Angeles with six offenses against Samantha Gailey (now Geimer), a then-13-year-old girl – unlawful sexual intercourse with a minor, rape by use of drugs, perversion, sodomy, a lewd and lascivious act upon a child under 14, and furnishing a controlled substance to a minor. At his arraignment, Polanski pleaded not guilty to all charges but later accepted a plea bargain whose terms included dismissal of the five more serious charges in exchange for a guilty plea to the lesser charge of engaging in unlawful sexual intercourse with a minor.

Polanski underwent a court-ordered psychiatric evaluation, and he was placed on probation. However, upon learning that he was likely to face imprisonment and subsequent deportation, Polanski became a fugitive from justice, fleeing to London and then France in February 1978, hours before he was due to be formally sentenced. Since then Polanski has mostly lived in France and has avoided visiting any countries likely to extradite him to the United States.

Rape case 
On March 10, 1977, Polanski, then aged 43, faced six charges involving drugging and raping 13-year-old Samantha Jane Gailey (now Samantha Geimer). The charges were rape by use of drugs, perversion, sodomy, lewd and lascivious act upon a child under 14, unlawful sexual intercourse with a female under the age of 18, and furnishing a controlled substance to a minor. This ultimately led to Polanski's guilty plea to a different charge of unlawful sexual intercourse with a minor.

According to Geimer's testimony to the grand jury, Polanski had asked Geimer's mother (a television actress and model) if he could photograph the girl as part of his work for the French edition of Vogue, which Polanski had been invited to guest-edit. Her mother allowed a private photoshoot. Geimer testified that she felt uncomfortable during the first session, in which she posed topless at Polanski's request, and initially did not wish to take part in a second but nevertheless agreed to another shoot. This took place on March 10, 1977, at the home of actor Jack Nicholson in the Mulholland area of Los Angeles.

When the crime was committed, Nicholson was on a ski trip in Colorado, and his live-in girlfriend Anjelica Huston who was there had left, but later returned while Polanski and Geimer were there. Geimer was quoted in a later article as saying that Huston became suspicious of what was going on behind the closed bedroom door and began banging on it, but left when Polanski insisted they were finishing up the photoshoot. "We did photos with me drinking champagne," Geimer says. "Toward the end it got a little scary, and I realized he had other intentions and I knew I was not where I should be. I just didn't quite know how to get myself out of there." In a 2003 interview, she recalled that she began to feel uncomfortable after he asked her to lie down on a bed, and described how she attempted to resist. "I said, 'No, no. I don't want to go in there. No, I don't want to do this. No!', and then I didn't know what else to do," she stated, adding: "We were alone and I didn't know what else would happen if I made a scene. So I was just scared, and after giving some resistance, I figured well, I guess I'll get to come home after this".

Geimer testified that Polanski provided champagne that they shared as well as part of a Quaalude, and despite her protests, he performed oral sex upon her, had vaginal intercourse, and sodomized her, each time after being told "no" and being asked to stop.

Although Geimer has insisted that the sex was non-consensual, Polanski has disputed this.

Describing the event in his autobiography, Polanski stated that he did not drug Geimer, that she "wasn't unresponsive", and that she did not respond negatively when he inquired as to whether or not she was enjoying what he was doing. The 28-page probation report submitted to the court by Kenneth Fare, his parole officer, and signed by deputy Irwin Gold, excused his behavior due to his creative genius and being an immigrant from a land with different morals, placed some of the blame on the victim and her mother, and concluded by saying that there was evidence "that the victim was not only physically mature, but willing." The officers report also quoted two psychiatrists' denial of Polanski being "a pedophile" or "sexual deviant".

Claiming to protect Geimer from a trial, her attorney arranged a plea bargain. Polanski accepted, and, under the terms of the agreement, the five initial charges were dismissed. Instead, Polanski pleaded guilty to the lesser charge of engaging in unlawful sexual intercourse with a minor.

Conviction and flight 
Under the terms of the plea agreement, the court ordered Polanski to report to a state prison for a 90-day psychiatric evaluation, but granted a stay to allow him to complete his current project. Under the terms set by the court, he traveled to Europe to complete filming. While in Europe for the filming of the upcoming 1979 remake of Hurricane, Polanski was photographed at Oktoberfest 1977 with his arms on multiple young girls and jars of beer around him. He was subsequently ordered to return to California and reported to Chino State Prison for the evaluation period beginning on December 19, 1977, and was released after 42 of the 90 scheduled days. Polanski's lawyers expected that Polanski would receive probation at the subsequent sentencing hearing, with the probation officer, examining psychiatrist, and the victim all recommending against prison time. During this time, on January 20, 1978, Polanski lost his job as the director of Hurricane.

Polanski's attorneys said that the presiding judge, Laurence J. Rittenband, suggested to them that he would send the director to prison and order him deported. According to the 2008 documentary Roman Polanski: Wanted and Desired, Los Angeles Deputy District Attorney David Wells showed Rittenband the photographs of Polanski partying in Munich with young girls, and said Polanski was being cavalier about the charges against the 13-year-old girl. This would have constituted an ex parte communication, as although Wells was not an attorney of record in the case, he was technically a lawyer for one of the parties involved due to his work for the state of California. In response to the threat of imprisonment, Polanski became a fugitive from justice, fleeing the United States and going to England. Regarding the proposed sentencing, Rittenband said:

Polanski fled initially to London on February 1, 1978, where he maintained a residence. A day later he traveled on to France, where he held citizenship, thus avoiding the possibility of extradition to the United States by the United Kingdom. Consistent with its extradition treaty with the US, France can refuse to extradite its own citizens, and an extradition request later filed by US officials was denied. Polanski has never returned to England and later sold his home there. The US could still request the arrest and extradition of Polanski from other countries should he visit them, and Polanski has avoided visits to countries (such as the UK) that were likely to extradite him. In 1979, Polanski gave a controversial interview with novelist Martin Amis in which, discussing his conviction, he said "If I had killed somebody, it wouldn't have had so much appeal to the press, you see?  But ... fucking, you see, and the young girls. Judges want to fuck young girls. Juries want to fuck young girls. Everyone wants to fuck young girls!" In 1983, Polanski told journalist Clive James that "I like the girls of that age. And because the girls of that age, for some reason like me." Later in this interview James asked, "Granted that you have this interest in young girls, and have never concealed that you have this interest in young girls, wasn't an incident like the one that happened more or less bound to happen eventually?" and Polanski responded, "Looking back at it, it probably was bound to happen, yes."

Original reactions to his flight 
Filmmaker Joseph Losey (who exiled himself to the UK after being blacklisted by HUAC) responded to Polanski's flight by saying "I have not contacted him – and I'm not going to." Actor Robert Stack called his flight "a coward's way out", and then added "the ranks are closing in on him".

Post-conviction 
Geimer sued Polanski in 1988, alleging sexual assault, intentional infliction of emotional distress and seduction. The case was settled out of court in 1993. After Polanski missed an October 1995 payment deadline, Geimer filed papers with the court, attempting to collect at least US$500,000. The court held that Polanski still owed her over $600,000, but it was unclear as of 2009 if this had since been paid.

In a 2003 interview, Geimer said, "Straight up, what he did to me was wrong. But I wish he would return to America so the whole ordeal can be put to rest for both of us. I'm sure if he could go back, he wouldn't do it again. He made a terrible mistake but he's paid for it." In 2008, Geimer stated in an interview that she wishes Polanski would be forgiven; "I think he's sorry, I think he knows it was wrong. I don't think he's a danger to society. I don't think he needs to be locked up forever and no one has ever come out ever – besides me – and accused him of anything. It was 30 years ago now. It's an unpleasant memory ... (but) I can live with it."

In 2008, a documentary film of the aftermath of the incident, Roman Polanski: Wanted and Desired, premiered at the Sundance Film Festival. Following review of the film, Polanski's attorney, Douglas Dalton, contacted the Los Angeles district attorney's office about prosecutor David Wells' conversation with the trial judge, Laurence J. Rittenband. Based on statements by Wells included in the film, Polanski and Dalton sought judicial review of whether Wells acted illegally and engaged in malfeasance by interfering with the operation of the trial. However, after Polanski's arrest, Wells recanted his statements in the film, admitting that he had lied and "tried to butter up the story to make me look better".

In December 2008, Polanski's lawyer filed a request to Judge David S. Wesley to have the case dismissed on the grounds of judicial and prosecutorial misconduct. The filing claims that Judge Rittenband (deceased in 1993) violated the plea bargain by keeping in communication about the case with deputy district attorney David Wells, who was not involved. In January 2009, Polanski's lawyer filed a further request to have the case dismissed, and to have the case moved out of Los Angeles, as the Los Angeles courts require him to appear before the court for any sentencing or dismissal, and Polanski did not intend to appear. In February 2009, Polanski's request was tentatively denied by Judge Peter Espinoza, who said that he would make a ruling if Polanski appeared in court. The same month, Samantha Geimer filed to have the charges against Polanski dismissed from court, saying that decades of publicity as well as the prosecutor's focus on lurid details continues to traumatize her and her family. Judge Espinoza also stated that he believed there was misconduct by the judge in the original case but Polanski must return to the United States to apply for dismissal.

There is no statute of limitations governing the case because Polanski had already been charged and pleaded guilty in 1978 to having had unlawful sex with a minor. While some legal experts interviewed in 2009 thought he might at that point face no jail time for unlawful sex with a minor, his failure to appear at sentencing is in itself a crime.

On July 7, 2009, Polanski's attorneys filed a petition for a writ of mandate (the California equivalent of a writ of mandamus) with the Second Appellate District of the California Court of Appeal in order to seek review of Judge Espinoza's decision on an expedited basis. The next day, the Court ordered the prosecution to file an opposition, thus indicating that it was assuming jurisdiction over the case. This was unusual; petitions for extraordinary writs are usually summarily denied without any explanation.

Arrest in Zurich 
On September 26, 2009, Polanski was detained by Swiss police at Zurich Airport while trying to enter Switzerland, in relation to his outstanding 1978 U.S. arrest warrant. Polanski had planned to attend the Zurich Film Festival to receive a Lifetime Achievement Award. The arrest followed a request by the United States that Switzerland apprehend Polanski. U.S. investigators had learned of his planned trip from a fax sent on September 22, 2009, from the Swiss Justice Ministry to the United States Department of Justice's Office of International Affairs, which had given them enough time to negotiate with Swiss authorities and lay the groundwork for an arrest. Polanski had been subject of an Interpol red notice at the request of the United States since 2005.

The Swiss Federal Department of Justice and Police said Polanski was put "in provisional detention". An arrest warrant or extradition to the United States could be subject to judicial review by the Federal Criminal Court and then the Federal Supreme Court, according to a ministry spokesman. Polanski announced that he intended to appeal extradition and hired lawyer Lorenz Erni to represent him. On October 6, his initial request for bail was refused by the Federal Department of Justice and Police; a spokesperson commented, "we continue to be of the opinion that there is a high risk of flight."

On May 2, 2010, Polanski published an open letter entitled "I can remain silent no longer!" on Bernard-Henri Lévy's web site. In it, he stated that on February 26, 2010, Roger Gunson (the deputy district attorney in charge of the case in 1977, retired by the time of the letter) testified under oath before Judge Mary Lou Villar in the presence of David Walgren (the present deputy district attorney in charge of the case, who was at liberty to contradict and question Gunson) that on September 16, 1977, Judge Rittenband stated to all the parties concerned that Polanski's term of imprisonment in Chino constituted the totality of the sentence he would have to serve. Polanski also stated that Gunson added that it was false to claim (as the present district attorney's office does in their request for his extradition) that the time he spent in Chino was for the purpose of a diagnostic study.

On July 12, 2010, the Swiss court rejected the U.S. request and released Polanski from custody.

Reactions to the arrest 
In reaction to the arrest, the foreign ministers of both France and Poland urged Switzerland to release Polanski, who holds dual citizenship of both countries, but subsequently withdrew their support for Polanski.

France 
The arrest provoked particular controversy in France, where over the years many had downplayed the severity of Polanski's crime, highlighting instead his achievements as a film director and the many years that had passed since his flight from the United States.

The French minister of Culture and Communication, Frédéric Mitterrand, was vehement in his support, all the while announcing his "very deep emotion" after the questioning of the director, "a French citizen" and "a film-maker of international dimension": "the sight of him thrown to the lions for an old story which doesn't make much sense, imprisoned while traveling to an event that was intending to honor him: caught, in short, in a trap, is absolutely dreadful." These reactions resulted in political backlash in France.

Daniel Cohn-Bendit criticized these statements by Mitterrand, mainly on the grounds that it was a "matter of justice" in as much as "a 13-year-old girl was raped", adding "I believe that a minister of Culture, even if his name is Mitterrand, should say: I'll wait and read the files [myself]". "It is a tough call, since it is true that a 13-year-old girl was raped, that she said in her own words 'I complained [as it was happening]' and that she afterwards added 'I accepted a large sum of money' [to remain silent]".

Marc Laffineur, vice president of the French National Assembly and a member of President Nicolas Sarkozy's center-right party, criticized government ministers for rushing to judgment, saying the charges against Polanski should not be minimized.

Marine Le Pen, from the National Front, during a TV talk show on how to prevent sex crime recidivism, criticized Mitterrand for his support of Polanski. She recalled that in 2005, Mitterrand had published the book The Bad Life in which he wrote about having sex with male prostitutes in Thailand. In the book, Mitterrand was quoted, "I got into the habit of paying for boys ... All these rituals of the market for youths, the slave market excite me enormously. One could judge this abominable spectacle from a moral standpoint but it pleases me beyond the reasonable." Le Pen called for Mitterrand to resign.

The SACD, a society that collects authorship fees for film and theater works and redistributes them to authors, hosted an international petition in favor of Polanski. The petition stated:

A number of celebrities, most of them French, expressed their support for Polanski by means of a public manifesto, whose concluding statements were "Roman Polanski is a French citizen, an artist of international reputation, now threatened to be extradited. This extradition, if brought into effect, would carry a heavy load of consequences as well as deprive the film-maker of his freedom." The signatories concluded: "we demand the immediate release of Roman Polanski." Not all assessments coming from the French film-making mainstream have been openly partisan, however. Luc Besson, for instance, remarked: "I do not know the history of the trial. ... I feel a lot of affection for [Polanski], he's a man I really like and I know him a bit, our daughters are very good friends but there is one justice, [and] it is the same for everyone".

On September 30, 2009, the French government dropped its public support for Polanski, on the grounds that he was not "above the law". Government spokesman Luc Chatel said: "We have a judicial procedure under way, for a serious affair, the rape of a minor, on which the American and Swiss legal systems are doing their job", adding: "One can understand the emotion that this belated arrest, more than 30 years after the incident, and the method of the arrest, have caused."

Public opinion polls in France consistently show between 65% and 75% of the population want to see Polanski extradited to the United States.

Poland 
Poland's Prime Minister Donald Tusk responded to early reactions by urging his cabinet ministers to exercise calm and reminding them that it is a "case of rape and of punishment for having sex with a child".

A 2009 opinion poll showed that more than 75% of Poles would not like to see Polanski escape another trial.

Switzerland 
In Switzerland, the arrest caused widely varying reactions in the media and in politics, while the Swiss minister of justice, Eveline Widmer-Schlumpf, defended the arrest as legally required under the Swiss–U.S. extradition treaty and as a matter of equality before the law.

United States
When asked if he would consider granting Polanski a pardon, then-California Governor Arnold Schwarzenegger said: "I think that he is a very respected person and I am a big admirer of his work. But, nevertheless, I think he should be treated like everyone else. It doesn't matter if you are a big-time movie actor or a big-time movie director or producer." Schwarzenegger added: "And one should look into all of the allegations, not only his allegations, but the allegations about his case. Was there something done wrong? You know, was injustice done in the case?"

More than 100 people in the film industry, including Woody Allen, Martin Scorsese, Darren Aronofsky, David Lynch, Wes Anderson, Harrison Ford, Harmony Korine, Michael Mann, and Jonathan Demme, among many others signed a petition in 2009 calling for Polanski's release. A subsequent petition the following year was signed by Jean-Luc Godard, Mathieu Amalric, Xavier Beauvois, Agnès Varda, Bertrand Tavernier, Jean-Stéphane Bron, Patricio Guzmán, Jean-Paul Civeyrac, Katell Quillévéré and Cristi Puiu; Olivier Assayas and Louis Garrel also signed both petitions. Emma Thompson originally signed the first petition, but later asked for her name to be removed after a conversation with 19-year-old college student and activist Caitlin Hayward-Tapp. Other celebrities like Meryl Streep, Whoopi Goldberg and Debra Winger did not sign either petition, but spoke out in support of Polanski in other ways. Harvey Weinstein also defended Polanski. However, in 2018, Natalie Portman, Xavier Dolan and Asia Argento expressed regret and apologized for signing the original petition.

Whereas a number of those in Hollywood have rallied behind Polanski, The Los Angeles Times reports that most others in the United States seem to have a different perspective: "In letters to the editor, comments on Internet blogs and remarks on talk radio and cable news channels, the national sentiment is running overwhelmingly against Polanski." Following the rearrest, David Wells announced that he had lied in the Wanted and Desired documentary, claiming that director Marina Zenovich told him that the documentary would not air in America, if he refused to lie in it (which Zenovich denied). Wells then proceeded to blast Polanski, calling him a pedophile rapist. Wells said "It's outrageous. This pedophile raped a 13-year-old girl. It's still an outrageous offense. It's a good thing he was arrested. I wish it would have happened years before."

In May 2018, Polanski was expelled from the Academy of Motion Picture Arts and Sciences. The Academy stated: "The board continues to encourage ethical standards that require members to uphold the academy's values of respect for human dignity." Polanski's legal team responded to the dismissal by threatening a lawsuit stating the Academy had violated its code of conduct. The Academy responded to Polanski's lawyers by stating: "The Board of Governors retains its independent duty and authority as outlined in the bylaws to address and take action on any matter, whether submitted by the process outlined above or not, related to a member's status and to enforce the Academy's Standards of Conduct." Polanski's wife Emmanuelle Seigner turned down an invitation to join the Academy in support.

Outcome 
On September 30, 2009, New York Times reported that Reid Weingarten of the firm Steptoe & Johnson, a well-known criminal defense lawyer, had been hired by Polanski for his defense along with attorneys Douglas Dalton, Bart Dalton, and Chad Hummel. According to the New York Times:

On October 21, after Swiss authorities had rejected Polanski's initial pleas to be released on bail pending the result of any extradition hearing, one of his lawyers, Georges Kiejman, floated the idea of a possible voluntary return to the United States in an interview with the radio station Europe 1: "If this process drags on, it is not completely impossible that Roman Polanski could choose to go finally to explain himself in the United States where the arguments in his favor exist."

On November 25, the Federal Criminal Court of Switzerland accepted Roman Polanski's plea to be freed on US$4.5M bail. The court said Polanski could stay at his chalet in the Swiss Alps and that he would be monitored by an electronic tag during his house arrest.

On December 10, Division 7 of the California Court of Appeal of the Second Appellate District heard oral argument on Polanski's petition for writ of mandate. Television stations including CNN, France 2 and TVN24 also filed applications to cover the hearing.

The Court denied Polanski's petition in an opinion filed on December 24. The Court reasoned that since Polanski had adequate legal remedies in 1977 and at present in 2009, there was no reason to carve out a special exception to the fugitive disentitlement doctrine. In arriving at that holding, the Court pointed out that neither side had realized that Polanski had the option of simply asking to be sentenced in absentia, which would result in a hearing where Polanski could directly attack the trial judge's alleged malfeasance in 1977. On January 6, 2010, upon remand to the superior court, Polanski's lawyers followed the appellate court's advice and presented a notarized letter from Polanski in which he asked to be sentenced in absentia. The court asked the parties to brief the issue and scheduled a hearing for January 25. At the hearing, Superior Court Judge Peter Espinoza ruled Polanski must be present in court for sentencing.

On July 12, 2010, the Swiss authorities announced that they would not extradite Polanski to the U.S. in part due to a fault in the American request for extradition. Polanski was no longer subject to house arrest, or any monitoring by Swiss authorities. In a press conference held by Swiss Justice Minister Eveline Widmer-Schlumpf, she stated that Polanski's extradition to the U.S. was rejected, in part, because U.S. officials failed to produce certain documents, specifically "confidential testimony from a January 2010 hearing on Mr. Polanski's original sentencing agreement". According to Swiss officials, the records were required to determine if Polanski's 42-day court-ordered psychiatric evaluation at Chino State Prison constituted Polanski's whole sentence according to the now-deceased Judge Rittenband. They reasoned that if this was the correct understanding, then "Roman Polanski would actually have already served his sentence and therefore both the proceedings on which the U.S. extradition request is founded and the request itself would have no foundation."

Legal actions 
In 2013, Samantha Geimer published her view on the rape in her autobiography The Girl: A Life in the Shadow of Roman Polanski.

In late October 2014, Polanski was questioned by prosecutors in Kraków, and released. Back in 2010 the Polish prosecutor general stated that under Polish law too much time had passed since the crime for Polanski to be extradited. On February 25, 2015, Polanski appeared in a Polish court for a hearing on the U.S. request for extradition. The judge scheduled another hearing to be held in April or sooner, to give time to review documents that arrived from Switzerland.

On October 30, 2015, Polish judge Dariusz Mazur denied a request by the United States to extradite Polanski.  According to the judge, allowing Polanski to be returned to American law enforcement would be an "obviously unlawful" act, depriving the filmmaker of his freedom and civil liberty.  His lawyers argued that extradition would violate the European Convention on Human Rights.  Polanski holds dual citizenship with Poland and France.

On November 27, 2015, Poland decided it will not extradite Polanski to the U.S. after prosecutors declined to challenge the court's ruling, agreeing that Polanski had served his punishment and did not need to face a U.S. court again. Preparations for a movie he was working on had been stalled by the extradition request from last year.

On December 6, 2016, the Supreme Court of Poland ruled to reject an appeal filed by Polish Minister of Justice Ziobro, and to uphold the October 2015 ruling.

On August 17, 2017, Los Angeles County Superior Court Judge Scott Gordon rejected a request from Samantha Geimer to dismiss the case against Polanski.

In December 2017, Polanski filed a ₪1.5 million suit in Herzliya Magistrates' Court against Israeli journalist and filmmaker Matan Uziel. Polanski maintained that Uziel, through his website, www.imetpolanski.com, falsely reported that five women had come forward to accuse him of raping them. Polanski was suing for libel and defamation of character. Herzliya Magistrates' Court rejected Polanski's request to be exempt from appearing in court after filing the libel suit. While Polanski gave various reasons for his inability to appear, the presiding judge, Gilad Hess, dismissed these one by one and ordered Polanski to pay Uziel ₪10,000 in costs. In November 2018, it was published that Polanski decided to drop the lawsuit, and was ordered by the court to pay Uziel ₪30,000 (US$8,000) for court costs. The court accepted Uziel's request that the suit not be dropped, but rather that it be rejected, making Polanski unable to sue Uziel again over the same issue in the future.

In November 2022, Roman Polanksi filed a cybersquatting dispute with World Intellectual Property Organization against the domain name imetpolanski.com. Polanski asked World Intellectual Property Organization to rule that the site was cybersquatting. However, the three-person panel ruled that Polanski didn't show the domain was registered and used in bad faith, nor did he show that the registrant, Matan Uziel, lacked rights or legitimate interests in the domain name.

Further reading

See also 
 Charlotte Lewis § Accusation against Roman Polanski

References

External links 
 1977 Polanski Plea Transcript – Contains additional links to grand jury testimony and probation officer's report
 37 Page Grand Jury Testimony of Samantha Gailey Implicating Polanski
 Roman Polanski Rape Victim Unveils Startling, Disturbing Photo for Book Cover (Exclusive)

March 1977 events in the United States
2009 in Switzerland
Roman Polanski
Sexual assaults in the United States
Sexual misconduct allegations

de:Roman Polański#Vorwurf der Vergewaltigung
es:Roman Polański#Samantha Geimer